The Associate is the original motion picture soundtrack of the 1996 film The Associate, starring Whoopi Goldberg.
 
The soundtrack features actress and rapper Queen Latifah, Sophie B. Hawkins, American country singer Wynonna Judd, Canadian-American recording artist Tamia, CeCe Peniston, Kate Pierson and Cindy Wilson (both of The B-52s), Jamaican reggae singer Patra and Swedish musician Louise Hoffsten.

The cover version of "Yes We Can Can", originally released by the American R&B girl group The Pointer Sisters as their first hit single (No.#11 on the US Hot 100) in 1973, was re-recorded for the soundtrack by Taral Hicks, Chantay Savage, LaShanda Reese and the Pointer Sisters themselves. Kate Pierson along with Cindy Wilson contributed with the new version of the McFadden & Whitehead's disco track "Ain't No Stoppin' Us Now" (No.#1 in the US R&B, at #5 in UK Top 75 in 1979). From the classics, James Brown's composition "It's a Man's Man's Man's World" (No.#1 on the US R&B in 1966), and Elton John's gospel ballad "The Border Song" (No.#92 in the US Hot 100 in 1970 were also present.

Track listing

Notes
 Mr. Big Stuff contains a sample of the self-titled song by Jean Knight

Credits and personnel
 CeCe Peniston - lead vocal
 Wynonna Judd - lead vocal
 Sophie B. Hawkins - lead vocal
 Tamia Hill - lead vocal

 Shades - lead and back vocals
 Queen Latifah - lead vocal, additional lyrics
 Free - lead vocal, additional lyrics
 Taral Hicks - lead vocal
 Chantay Savage - lead vocal
 LaShanda Reese - lead vocal
 Anita Pointer - lead vocal
 The Pointer Sisters - back vocals
 Patra - lead vocal
 James Brown - lead vocal, writer, producer
 Kate Pierson - lead vocal
 Cindy Wilson - lead vocal
 Louise Hoffsten - lead vocal, writer, harmonica
 The Tri-City Singers - back vocals
 Tanya Smith - back vocal
 Shonda Howard - back vocal
 Vicki Mc Kisic - back vocal
 Timmy Maia - back vocal
 Sonja - back vocal
 Claytoven Richardson - back vocal
 Skyler Jett - back vocal
 Sandy Griffith - back vocal
 Nikita Germaine - back vocal
 Al Beretta - rap
 Christopher Tyng - writer, producer, synthesizer, drum programming
 Taylor Tyng - writer, guitar
 Diane Warren - writer
 Bernie Taupin - writer
 Elton John - writer
 Narada Michael Walden - writer, producer, background vocal arrangement, drums, paste cymbals
 Sally Jo Dakota - writer
 Christopher Stewart - writer, producer, keyboards, programming and sequencing
 Sean K.Hall - writer, producer, keyboards, programming and sequencing
 London D.Jones - writer, co-producer
 J.Broussard - writer
 R.Williams - writer
 C.Washington - writer
 DJ Clark Kent - producer, additional lyrics, drum and sample programming
 Allen Toussaint - writer
 Dorothy Smith - writer
 Clifton "Specialist" Dillon - writer, producer

 Roy Jobe - writer, all instruments (on "Are You Ready for Me?")
 Erik "E Smooth" Hicks - writer, co-producer, background vocal arrangement
 Betty Jean Newsome - writer
 Jerry Cohen - writer
 McFadden & Whitehead - writers
 Daryl Simmons - producer, keyboards, drums
 Donald Lawrence - producer, back vocal
 Vassal Benford - producer
 Steve Russell - producer, vocal arrangement
 Steve Lindsey - producer
 Leif Larson - producer, guitar, keyboards, programming
 Cedric Thompson - co-producer
 Jimi "The Sweet" Fischer - co-producer, keyboards, guitar and bass, drums programming
 David "Frazeman" Frazer - associate producer
 Ronnie Garrett - bass
 Tarus Mateen - bass
 Vance Taylor - acoustic piano
 Jeremy Haynes - drums
 Jamie Hoover - guitar
 Louis Biancaniello - keyboards, drums, bass, programming
 Ernie Hayes - piano
 Dud Bascomb - trumpet
 Waymond Reed - trumpet
 Lamarr Wright - trumpet
 Haywood Henry - saxophone
 Billy Butler - guitar
 Bernard "Pretty" Purdie - drums
 Sammy Lowe - arranger, conductor
 John Robinson - drums
 Freddy Washington - bass
 Aaron Zigman - keyboards
 Dean Parks - guitar
 Waddy Wachtel - guitar
 Staffan Astner - guitar
 Nicci Wallin - drums, percussion
 Leonard Ostlund - percussion
 Eric Anest - programming
 James Bunton - project coordinator
 Marla Winston - production coordinator
 Lorenzo "Cornbread" Tranberg - production assistant
 Janice Lee - production coordinator
 Cherise Miller - production coordinator
 Cynthia Shiloh - production coordinator
 Kulan Kevin Walden - production coordinator

See also
List of artists who reached number one on the US Dance chart

References

External links
 [ The Associate (OST)] at AllMusic

1996 soundtrack albums
Motown soundtracks
albums produced by Narada Michael Walden
Comedy film soundtracks